Giuseppe Bramieri (active late 16th and early 17th centuries) was an Italian painter of the Mannerist period, active in Piacenza.

Biography
Little is known of his biography. His opus is limited to three signed works:
Madonna and Child with Saints John the Baptist and Bartholemew, in Parish church of Gambaro in Piacenza
Madonna and Two Saints, in Santi Severino e Sossio, Naples
Martyrdom of St Lawrence in San Francesco, Piacenza

His works appear stiff, and influenced by Gian Paolo Lomazzo, Michelangelo or Denis Calvaert.

References

Year of birth unknown
Year of death unknown
16th-century Italian painters
Italian male painters
17th-century Italian painters
People from Piacenza
Italian Mannerist painters